Australia and the Barbarians have played each other 12 times, of which Australia has won the most, with nine victories. Their first match against one another was played at Cardiff Arms Park. The Barbarians won this match 9–6.

Overall summary

Matches

See also

References

External links

Barbarian F.C. matches
Australia national rugby union team matches